South Kensington is a census-designated place and an unincorporated area in Montgomery County, Maryland, United States. It had a population of 8,829 in 2020.

Geography
As an unincorporated area, South Kensington's boundaries are not officially defined. South Kensington is, however, recognized by the United States Census Bureau as a census-designated place, and by the United States Geological Survey as a populated place located at  (39.017683, −77.076605).

According to the United States Census Bureau, the place has a total area of 2.1 square miles (5.5 km), all land.

Demographics

As of the census of 2000, there were 7,887 people, 3,061 households, and 2,170 families residing in the area. The racial makeup of the area was 92.08% White, 2.42% African American, 0.15% Native American, 2.83% Asian, 0.05% Pacific Islander, 0.95% from other races, and 1.52% from two or more races. Hispanic or Latino of any race were 4.88% of the population.

There were 3,061 households, out of which 33.2% had children under the age of 18 living with them, 61.9% were married couples living together, 6.9% had a female householder with no husband present, and 29.1% were non-families. 23.0% of all households were made up of individuals, and 11.2% had someone living alone who was 65 years of age or older. The average household size was 2.52 and the average family size was 2.99.

In the area, the population was spread out, with 24.1% under the age of 18, 3.0% from 18 to 24, 28.7% from 25 to 44, 26.4% from 45 to 64, and 17.7% who were 65 years of age or older. The median age was 42 years. For every 100 females, there were 89.1 males. For every 100 females age 18 and over, there were 84.2 males.

The median income for a household in the area was $102,048, and the median income for a family was $111,753. Males had a median income of $73,558 versus $52,260 for females. The per capita income for the area was $44,755. About 1.4% of families and 1.5% of the population were below the poverty line, including 1.0% of those under age 18 and 2.4% of those age 65 or over.

References

Census-designated places in Maryland
Census-designated places in Montgomery County, Maryland